INS Shivalik (F47) is the lead ship of her class of stealth multi-role frigates built for the Indian Navy. She is the first stealth warship built by India. She was built at the Mazagon Dock Limited (MDL) located in Mumbai. Construction of the vessel began in 2001 and was completed by 2009. She underwent sea trials from thereon before being commissioned on 29 April 2010.

Shivalik features improved stealth and land attacking features over the preceding s. She is also the first Indian navy ship to use the CODOG (COmbined Diesel Or Gas) propulsion system.

Design and description
The Shivalik-class frigates were conceived as part of the Indian Navy's Project 17, which set down the requirements for a class of stealthy frigates to be designed and built in India. The Directorate of Naval Design (DND)'s design specifications for the Shivalik class called for "5000 ton stealth frigates (Project 17) incorporating advanced signature suppression and signature management features". The first three units were formally ordered by the Indian Navy in early 1999.

General characteristics and propulsion 
The complement is about 257, including 37 officers.

The ship uses two  Pielstick 16 PA6 STC diesel engines, for cruising, or two  GE LM2500+ gas turbines, for high speed bursts, in CODOG configuration.

Electronics and sensors 
INS Shivalik is equipped with a wide range of electronics and sensors. These include:
 1 ×  MR-760 Fregat M2EM 3-D radar
 4 ×  MR-90 Orekh radars
 1 × Elta EL/M-2238 STAR
 2 ×  Elta EL/M-2221 STGR
 1 × BEL APARNA
In addition, it uses HUMSA (hull-mounted sonar array), ATAS/Thales Sintra towed array systems and the BEL Ajanta Electronic Warfare suite.

Armament 
INS Shivalik is equipped with a mix of Russian, Indian and Western weapon systems. These include the  Otobreda naval gun, Klub and BrahMos supersonic anti-ship missiles, Shtil-1 anti-aircraft missiles, RBU-6000 anti-submarine rocket launchers and DTA-53-956 torpedo launchers. A 32 cell VLS launched Barak SAM and AK-630 act as Close-in weapon systems(CIWS). The ship also carries two HAL Dhruv or Sea King Mk. 42B helicopters.

Construction and service

The construction of INS Shivalik began in 2000. Her keel was laid in July 2001. She was launched in June 2004 and was originally planned for commission by 2005 However, she was commissioned in April 2010.

Operational history 
The Japanese Maritime Self Defence Force (JMSDF) was represented by two destroyers, one maritime patrol aircraft and a helicopter.

The four ships entered Tokyo on 5 June 2012 after visiting Singapore, Vietnam, Philippines and Republic of Korea. They stayed in Tokyo for three days. This visit coincided with commemoration of 60 years of diplomatic relations between India and Japan. Vice Admiral Anil Chopra, Flag Officer Commanding-in-Chief Eastern Naval Command, also visited Tokyo to witness the first JIMEX.

After the deployment in the north Pacific, the battle group was deployed in the South China Sea. As part of India's Look East policy, the ships visited the Shanghai port on 13 June 2012, for a five-day goodwill tour. INS Shakti served as the fuel and logistics tanker to the three destroyers. The ships left the port on 17 June 2012. Before leaving the port, the ships conducted a routine passage exercise with the People's Liberation Army Navy.

After the visits to Singapore, Vietnam, Philippines, Japan, South Korea and China, the ships visited Port Klang, Malaysia. This was the battle group's last port call during its two-month-long deployment, which had started in May 2012. After this she returned to the Eastern Fleet of the Indian Navy and since has been docked there.

INS Shivalik participated in the People's Liberation Army Navy's (PLAN) 65th anniversary celebrations held in Qingdao. India, Indonesia and China conducted three high level exercises including anti-hijack exercise. PLAN official who visited the ship mentioned that "The Indian ship is a very strong ship with powerful weapons," and "This gives us a good opportunity to see the Indian Navy". INS Shivalik sailed  from Port Blair to Qingdao, without being assisted by any support vessel and without official from headquarters, showcasing the confidence of the crew and the autonomy they enjoy. PLAN and Indian Navy decided to further deepen the Naval bond between the two nations.

In July 2014, this indigenous stealth frigate actively participated in INDRA War Games, a naval and army counter-terrorism exercise, with Russia. There Rajput-class destroyer  and fleet tanker INS Shakti were also part of Indian fleet accompanying her.

Shivalik participated in the International Fleet Review 2022.

References

External links

 Project 17 frigate @ Bharat-rakshak.com
 Image of INS Shivalik launch
 World-class warships at Indian prices
 Novenco Pdf document

Shivalik-class frigates
Frigates of the Indian Navy
2003 ships
Ships built in India